Mulug is a Mandal in Siddipet district of Telangana State, India.

The villages in Mulug mandal includes:Narsampally, Achaipalle, Aliabad, Annasagar, Bahilampur, Banda Mailaram, Baswapuram, Chinnathimapur, Dasarlapalle, Gangadharapalle, Kasireddypally, Ksheerasagar, Vagunoothi, Vantimamidi, Kamalabad, Kokkonda, Kolthur, Kotiyal, Lakshmakkapalle, Mamidiyal, Mulug, Nagireddypalle, Narsapur, Singannagudem, Surampur, Tunkibollaram, Zapthisingaipalle etc..

References

Mandal headquarters in Siddipet district
Villages in Siddipet district